Paul Bazelaire (4 March 1886 – 11 December 1958) was a French cellist and composer.

Bazelaire was born in Sedan, Ardennes. He studied under Jules Delsart.

He won many prizes for literature and poetry in France and Belgium.

External links
 Paul Bazelaire site – biography, list of compositions
 Biography
 Cello.org Biography
 

1886 births
1958 deaths
People from Sedan, Ardennes
French classical cellists
Conservatoire de Paris alumni
Academic staff of the Conservatoire de Paris
Officiers of the Légion d'honneur
20th-century classical musicians
20th-century cellists